Nicola Kāwana (born 1970) is a New Zealand actress, best known for playing Huia Samuels on the longest running New Zealand television series Shortland Street. Other roles include Mercy Peak, Jackson's Wharf, Lollie in The Man Who Lost His Head and “Mad” Maggie in Apex Legends.

Career
Kāwana was born in Taranaki, and was part of Taranaki Youth Theatre. She did actor training at Toi Whakaari: New Zealand Drama School graduating in 1994. 

As of 20 August 2006, the character Huia Samuels has been written out of Shortland Street. It was reported that Kāwana was very angry with the decision. However, the story that appeared went to print based on gossip. Kāwana was unable to give her side of the story due to the legal constraints of her contract to South Pacific Pictures, the makers of the serial programme.

July 2021 was the premier of a play Kāwana wrote called Kūpapa. This play is about an ancestor of Kāwana's, Lucy Takiora Lord, who was involved in significant historical events in Aotearoa New Zealand. The play was presented by Te Pou Theatre in Auckland and directed by Erina Daniels. 

Kāwana also works as a garden writer, gardener and presenter on the Maori TV show, Whānau Living. Nicola is a member of Equity New Zealand, a UNICEF Global Parent.

Filmography

Film

Television

Video games

Theatre
Kāwana's first professional role was in Hone Tuwhare’s In the Wilderness Without a Hat in 1989 at Taki Rua.

Her theatre acting roles include:

Awards 
1996 Chapman Tripp Theatre Awards - Most Promising Female Newcomer of the Year - Mo & Jess Kill Susie by Gary Henderson

References

External links 

 Full CV of Nicole Kawana at aucklandactors.co.nz
 NZ Herald Story about character cut
 Nicola Kawana Home NZ

1970 births
Living people
New Zealand television actresses
People from Hāwera
New Zealand soap opera actresses
20th-century New Zealand actresses
21st-century New Zealand actresses
New Zealand dramatists and playwrights